Inauguration of Grover Cleveland may refer to: 

First inauguration of Grover Cleveland, 1885
Second inauguration of Grover Cleveland, 1893

See also